Unpredictable is the first collaborative studio album by American rapper Malik B. and producer Mr. Green. It was released on February 24, 2015. It was also the last album released by Malik B. before he died on July 29, 2020.

Background 
With his popular "Live From The Streets" web series (Noisey/Vice), Mr. Green has forged a reputation for harnessing the serendipitous musical moments that arise from life's chance encounters with talented musicians. So when he had one of those encounters with the legendary Roots crew emcee, Malik B, outside of The Roots' annual picnic in 2012, it made perfect sense that they would turn a brief moment of mutual inspiration into a full-fledged collaborative album. Malik B and Mr. Green's collaborative album, "Unpredictable", is an appropriate title for the thirteen track journey through the kind of handcrafted hip hop created when two skilled musicians come together to capture the mystique that unpredictably arrives during the recording process. "Malik would show up at the studio with a garbage bag of rhymes and go through them. Some of them were old and weathered, literally falling apart", describes Mr. Green. "Then he would just start recording the song in one take: intro, verses, chorus. It was nothing like I'd seen before". Although recording ''Unpredictable'' was chaotic at times, the duo's chemistry is undeniable. Malik adds, "Our chemistry is just crazy; our chemistry is like algebra".

Track listing 
All tracks produced by Mr. Green
Samples 
 "What Can I Say" sampled "What Can I Say" by Mr. Green (2006)
 "Tyrants" sampled "The Stopper (Main Attraction Remix)" by Cutty Ranks (1991)

Personnel 
 Malik Abdul Basit – primary performer
 Aaron Green – producer
 Scott Stallone at Found Sound Recording (Phila, PA) – mixing on tracks 1–11,13
 Chris Conway – mixing on track 12
 Pete Humphreys – mastering
 Vshootz – photography
 Dan Bradley – design and layout

References 

2015 albums